The Department of Territories was an Australian government department that existed between May 1951 and February 1968.

Scope
The department's functions were:
Administration of territories:
Ashmore and Cartier Islands
Nauru
New Guinea
Norfolk Island
Northern Territory
Papua
Australian New Guinea Production Control Board
Australian School of Pacific Administration
British Phosphate Commissioners
Christmas Island Phosphate Commission
Expropriated Properties (New Guinea)
Shipping services to certain Pacific islands
Shipping services within the Territories of Papua and New Guinea  
Transfer of prisoners from the external territories and the Northern Territory

Structure
The department was a Commonwealth Public Service department, staffed by officials who were responsible to the Minister for Territories.

References

Ministries established in 1951
Territories
1951 establishments in Australia